Shahram Mahmoudi (born 20 July 1988 in Mianeh) is an Iranian volleyball player who plays for the Iran men's national volleyball team. He competed at the Rio 2016 Summer Olympics.
Mahmoudi debut national game in 2013 Grand Championship did with invitations Julio Velasco.
He is the younger brother of volleyball player Behnam Mahmoudi. He and his brother are originally from Mianeh, East Azerbaijan. Mahmoudi have been three times named Most Valuable Player in Asian Club Championship.

Awards

Individuals
 2012 Asian Club Championship "Best Spiker"
 2014 Asian Club Championship "Most Valuable Player"
 2016 Asian Club Championship "Most Valuable Player"
 2017 Asian Club Championship "Most Valuable Player"

National team
 2007 FIVB U21 World Championship -  Bronze Medal
 2013 Asian Championship -  Gold Medal
 2014 Asian Games -  Gold Medal

Clubs
 2008 Iranian Super League -  Champion, with Paykan
 2008 Asian Club Championship -  Champion, with Paykan
 2009 Asian Club Championship -  Champion, with Paykan
 2009 Iranian Super League -  Champion, with Paykan
 2012 Iranian Super League -  Champion, with Kalleh
 2012 Asian Club Championship –  Bronze medal, with Kalleh
 2013 Iranian Super League -  Champion, with Kalleh
 2013 Asian Club Championship -  Champion, with Kalleh
 2014 Iranian Super League -  Champion, with Matin
 2014 Asian Club Championship -  Champion, with Matin
 2016 Iranian Super League -  Champion, with Sarmayeh Bank
 2016 Asian Club Championship -  Champion, with Sarmayeh Bank
 2017 Iranian Super League -  Champion, with Sarmayeh Bank
 2017 Asian Club Championship -  Champion, with Sarmayeh Bank
 2018 Iranian Super League -  Champion, with Sarmayeh Bank
 2018 Asian Club Championship -  Champion, with Khatam Ardakan

References

External links
FIVB profile

1988 births
Living people
People from Tehran
People from Karaj
Iranian men's volleyball players
People from Mianeh
Asian Games gold medalists for Iran
Asian Games medalists in volleyball
Volleyball players at the 2014 Asian Games
Olympic volleyball players of Iran
Volleyball players at the 2016 Summer Olympics
Medalists at the 2014 Asian Games
21st-century Iranian people